Hippolyte-Romain-Joseph Duthilloeul (1788-1862) was a French litterateur and biographer.

He has written a biographical dictionary of notable men of the city of Douai, his homeland. In 1834, he became librarian of the city of Douai and allowed the rescue of book collections and archives that enrich the current Douai Library.

Works 
  Galeries douaisienne ou Biographie des hommes remarquables de la ville de Douai, by R.-H. Duthilloeul, 1844

1788 births
1862 deaths
French biographers